Dharmaa is a 2010 Nepali film directed by Dipendra K. Khanal. It was the second Nepali film after 22 years to feature actress Manisha Koirala, who had been busy with Indian films. The film was considered commercially successful at the box office .

Cast 
Manisha Koirala
Rajesh Hamal
Nikhil Upreti
Rejina Upreti

See also
List of Nepalese films

References

2010 films
2010 drama films
2010s Nepali-language films
Films directed by Dipendra K Khanal
Nepalese drama films
Nepalese action films